Not Only But Always is a British TV movie, originally screened on the Channel 4 network in the UK on 30 December 2004.

Description
Written and directed by playwright Terry Johnson, the film tells the story of the working and personal relationship between the comedians Peter Cook and Dudley Moore, a hugely popular duo in the UK during the 1960s and 1970s.

Focusing primarily on Cook, the film traces the pair from their first meeting through their career as part of the Beyond the Fringe review, their television series Not Only... But Also (from which the film takes its title) and various other projects before their later estrangement as Moore became a successful Hollywood film star and Cook remained in the UK. Although some events are fictionalised and condensed, and the film was criticised in some quarters for an unsympathetic portrayal of many of Cook's faults, it was generally well-received critically.

Cast
 Rhys Ifans as Peter Cook
 Aidan McArdle as Dudley Moore
 Jodie Rimmer as Wendy Snowden 
 Camilla Power as Judy Huxtable
 Daphne Cheung as Lin Chong
 Jonathan Aris as Jonathan Miller
 Alan Cox as Alan Bennett
 Josephine Davison as Eleanor Bron

Awards
Not Only But Always was nominated for a BAFTA for Best Single Drama, with Rhys Ifans winning the Best Actor award for his portrayal of Peter Cook.

See also
Pete and Dud: Come Again

External links

Channel 4 original programming
2004 biographical drama films
2004 television films
2004 films
British biographical drama films
Dudley Moore
Peter Cook
2000s British films
British drama television films